Local elections to Northumberland County Council, a county council in the north east of England, were held on 1 May 2008, resulting in a council with no overall control and with Liberal Democrat members forming the largest political group on the new Council.

Results

References

External links
Northumberland County Council

2008
2008 English local elections
21st century in Northumberland